Farmington is a village located in the county of Gloucestershire, in England. As of 2011 the village had 112 residents. It is mentioned in the Domesday Book of 1086  as Tormentone.

History
Farmington was sold in 1724 to Edmund Waller of Beaconsfield (died 1771); and thence by descent to Edmund Waller (d.1788); Edmund Waller (d.1810); Rev. Harry Waller (d.1824) (Rector of Farmington from 1786, and of Vicar of Winslow from 1789); Harry Edmund (d.1869); Edmund Waller (d.1898); and Major-General William Noel Waller, RA (d.1909), whose executors sold it in 1910.

The Church of St Peter was built in the 12th century. It is a grade I listed building.

Notable residents
 Robert Carr (1916-2012), English 20th Century politician. Grave in St. Peter's Churchyard.

References

Villages in Gloucestershire
Civil parishes in Gloucestershire
Cotswold District